Henry Grigg (24 May 1906 – 9 July 1991) was an Australian cricketer. He played three first-class matches for Western Australia in 1925/26.

See also
 List of Western Australia first-class cricketers

References

External links
 

1906 births
1991 deaths
Australian cricketers
Western Australia cricketers